The 69th annual Venice International Film Festival, organized by Venice Biennale, took place at Venice Lido from 29 August to 8 September 2012. The festival opened with the Indian director Mira Nair's The Reluctant Fundamentalist, and closed with the Out of Competition film The Man Who Laughs, directed by Jean-Pierre Ameris. Terrence Malick's film To the Wonder was met with both boos and cheers from critics at its premiere.

The Golden Lion for Best Film was won by Pietà, directed by South Korean filmmaker Kim Ki-duk. Paul Thomas Anderson for The Master won the Silver Lion  for Best Director. Additionally, American actors Joaquin Phoenix and Philip Seymour Hoffman shared the prize for Best Actor for that film. Israeli actress Hadas Yaron for her performance in Fill the Void was selected as the Best Actress in the festival.

Jury
The international juries of the 69th Venice International Film Festival included:

Main competition (Venezia 69)
 Michael Mann, American director (Jury President)
 Marina Abramović, Serbian performance artist
 Laetitia Casta, French actress
 Peter Ho-sun Chan, Hong Kong director
 Ari Folman, Israeli director
 Matteo Garrone, Italian director
 Ursula Meier, French-Swiss director
 Samantha Morton, English actress and director
 Pablo Trapero, Argentine director

Horizons (Orizzonti)
 Pierfrancesco Favino, Italian actor (President)
 Sandra den Hamer, Dutch director of the Rotterdam Festival
 Runa Islam, Bangladeshi-born British visual artist and filmmaker
 Jason Kliot, American independent film producer
 Nadine Labaki, Lebanese actress and director
 Milcho Manchevski, Macedonian film director
 Amir Naderi, Iranian film director, screenwriter and photographer

Opera Prima (Venice Award for a Debut Film)
 Shekhar Kapur, Indian film director, actor and producer (President)
 Michel Demopoulos, Greek film critic
 Isabella Ferrari, Italian television, theatre and cinema actress
 Matt Reeves, American screenwriter, director and producer
 Bob Sinclar, French record producer, DJ, and Yellow Productions owner

Official selection

In Competition
The following eighteen films were selected for the main competition:

Out of Competition
The following films were selected for the out of competition section:

Horizons
The following films were selected for the Horizons (Orizzonti) section:

Highlighted title indicates the Orizzonti Award for Best Feature Film winner.

Venice Classics
The following selection of restored classic films and documentaries on cinema were screened for this section:

«80!»
The following rare films from the Biennale's Historical Archives were screened for this retrospective section:

Special Screenings
The following films of the Official Selection were presented as Special Screenings:

Autonomous sections

Venice International Film Critics' Week
The following films were selected for the Critics' Week:

Venice Days
The following films were selected for the Venice Days section:

Awards

Official selection
The following Official Awards were conferred at the 69th edition:

In Competition (Venezia 69)
 Golden Lion: Pietà by Kim Ki-duk
 Silver Lion for Best Director: Paul Thomas Anderson for The Master
 Special Jury Prize: Paradise: Faith by Ulrich Seidl
 Volpi Cup for Best Actor: Philip Seymour Hoffman and Joaquin Phoenix for The Master
 Volpi Cup for Best Actress: Hadas Yaron for Fill the Void
 Marcello Mastroianni Award (for the best emerging actor or actress): Fabrizio Falco for Dormant Beauty and It Was the Son
 Award for Best Screenplay: Olivier Assayas for Something in the Air (Après mai)
 Award for Best Cinematography: Daniele Cipri for It Was the Son (È stato il figlio)

Horizons (Orizzonti)
 Best Film: Three Sisters (San zimei) by Wang Bing
 Special Jury Prize: Tango libre by Frédéric Fonteyne
 Horizons YouTube Award for Best Short Film: Invitation (Cho-De) by Min-Young Yoo
 European Film Awards (short film): Out Of Frame (Titloi telous) by Yorgos Zois

Special Awards
 Golden Lion for Lifetime Achievement: Francesco Rosi
 Persol Tribute to Visionary Talent Award: Michael Cimino
 Jaeger-LeCoultre Glory to the Filmmaker Award: Spike Lee
 L’Oréal Paris per il Cinema Award: Giulia Bevilacqua

Autonomous sections
The following official and collateral awards were conferred to films of the autonomous sections:

Venice International Film Critics' Week
Lion of the Future
"Luigi de Laurentis" Award for a Debut Film: Mold (Küf) by Ali Aydın
 "RaroVideo" Audience Award: Eat Sleep Die (Äta sova dö) by Gabriela Pichler
 Arca CinemaGiovani Award for Best Italian film: The Ideal City (La città ideale) by Luigi Lo Cascio

Venice Days (Giornati degli Autori)
 Label Europa Cinemas Award: Crawl by Hervé Lasgouttes
 Lina Mangiacapre Award: Queen of Montreuil by Sólveig Anspach
 Premio Cinematografico “Civitas Vitae prossima” Award: Terramatta by Costanza Quatriglio

Other collateral awards
The following collateral awards were conferred to films of the official selection:

 FIPRESCI Awards
Best Film (Main competition): The Master by Paul Thomas Anderson
Best Film (Horizons): The Interval (L'intervallo) by Leonardo Di Costanzo (Horizons)
 SIGNIS Award: To the Wonder by Terrence Malick
Special mention: Fill the Void (Lemale et ha'halal) by Rama Burshtein
 Francesco Pasinetti (SNGCI) Award
Best Film: The Interval by Leonardo Di Costanzo (Horizons)
Best Documentary: The Human Cargo (La nave dolce) by Daniele Vicari (Out of Competition)
Best Actor: Valerio Mastandrea for Balancing Act (Gli equilibristi) (Horizons)
Pasinetti Speciale: Clarisse by Liliana Cavani (Out of Competition)
 Leoncino d'Oro Agiscuola Award: Pieta (È stato il figlio) by Kim Ki-duk
Cinema for UNICEF mention: It Was the Son (È stato il figlio) by Daniele Ciprì
Brian Award: Dormant Beauty (Bella Addormentata) by Marco Bellocchio
Queer Lion Award (Associazione Cinemarte): The Weight (Muge) by Jeon Kyu-hwan 
 Arca CinemaGiovani Award -  Venezia 69: The Fifth Season (La Cinquième saison) by Peter Brosens and Jessica Woodworth
 Biografilm Lancia Award (ex-aequo): The Human Cargo (La nave dolce) by Daniele Vicari & Bad25 by Spike Lee  (Out of competition)
 Bisato d'Oro Award:
Best Film: Bellas Mariposas by Salvatore Mereu
Best Director: Jazmín López for Lions (Leones)
Best Actress: Nora Aunor for Thy Womb
 CICT - UNESCO "Enrico Fulchignoni" Award: The Interval by Leonardo Di Costanzo (Horizons)
 CICAE - Cinema d’Arte e d’Essai Award: Wadjda by Haifaa Al Mansour (Horizons)
 CinemAvvenire Award:
Best film - Venezia 69: Paradies: Glaube by Ulrich Seidl
Best film - Il cerchio non è rotondo: Wadjda by Haifaa Al Mansour (Horizons)
 FEDIC Award:  The Interval by Leonardo Di Costanzo (Horizons)
Special mention: Bellas Mariposas by Salvatore Mereu
 Fondazione Mimmo Rotella Award: Something in the Air (Après ai) by Olivier Assayas
 Future Film Festival Digital Award: Bad25 by Spike Lee (Out of competition)
Special mention: Spring Breakers by Harmony Korine
 P. Nazareno Taddei Award: Pieta by Kim Ki-duk
Special mention: Thy Womb (Sinapupunan) by Brillante Mendoza
 Lanterna Magica (CGS) Award: The Interval by Leonardo Di Costanzo (Horizons)
 Open Award: The Company You Keep by Robert Redford (Out of competition)
 La Navicella – Venezia Cinema Award: Thy Womb by Brillante Mendoza
 AIF - FORFILMFEST  Award: The Interval by Leonardo Di Costanzo (Horizons)
 Golden Mouse: Pieta by Kim Ki-duk
 Silver Mouse: Anton's Right Here (Anton tut ryadom) by Lyubov Arkus (Out of competition)
 UK - Italy Creative Industries Award – Best Innovative Budget Award: The Interval by Leonardo Di Costanzo (Horizons)
 Gillo Pontecorvo - Arcobaleno Latino Award: Laura Delli Colli
 Christopher D. Smithers Foundation Award: Low Tide by Roberto Minervini (Horizons)
 Interfilm Award for Promoting Interreligious Dialogue: Wadjda by Haifaa Al Mansour (Horizons)
 Giovani Giurati del Vittorio Veneto Film Festival Award: The Company You Keep by Robert Redford (Out of competition)
Special mention: Toni Servillo for his role in It Was the Son Green Drop Award: The Fifth Season by Peter Brosens and Jessica Woodworth

Controversy over Golden Lion
The jury led by filmmaker Michael Mann originally was to award the top Golden Lion prize to Paul Thomas Anderson's The Master, along with the Silver Lion Best Director award and the Best Actor award.  However, because of festival's new rule prohibiting pairing the Golden Lion with any other prizes, the jury was asked "to re-deliberate to remove" one of the awards for The Master, and the Golden Lion was awarded to Kim Ki-duk's Pietà instead. On the other hand, the jury was planned to award the Coppa Volpi for the Best Actress prize to Jo Min-su, who acted Jang Mi-sun in Pietà''. However, because of the festival's new rule, the jury couldn't award a prize to Jo Min-su. In the official reception which was held after the festival was over, many juries, such as Samantha Morton and Peter Chan met Jo, saying that "Jo's acting was touching that changed my life. I shed tears of Jo's play."

References

External links

Venice Film Festival 2012 Awards on IMDb

Venice Film Festival
Venice Film Festival
Venice Film Festival
Venice Film Festival
Film
August 2012 events in Italy
September 2012 events in Italy